The Battle of Toppur was one of the largest battles in the history of India. In this battle, cannons were used at a large scale for the first time in South India. It caused complete destruction of the already declining Vijayanagara Empire. It was a civil war fought by the claimants for the kingship of the Vijayanagara Empire. Jagga Raya challenged the Sriranga Authority on behalf of his nephew.

Background
Venkatapati Raya, the ruler of the Vijayanagara Empire belonging to the Aravidu line died without direct heirs. So he declared his nephew Sriranga II as heir. But Venkatapati's queen Bayamma, who had adopted a Brahmin boy  named Chenga Raya wanted him to succeed to the throne. Her ambition caused a civil war in the ranks of the empire. Bayamma's brother Gobburi Jagga Raya kidnapped and murdered the king and his whole family. Only his one son survived. This brutal murder caused angst in his court among other nayak commanders. The commander of Imperial army Velugoti Yachama Nayaka revolted and supported the son of Sriranga II named Rama Deva Raya.

Battle
The location of the battle that took place is mentioned by most historians as Toppur, located on the banks of Cauvery river a mile of Grand Anicut, which is present day Thogur.

Aftermath

It was the battle which cause the complete disintegration of the Vijayanagar  Empire, which was reviving slowly. This civil war caused severe problems to the Vijayanagara Empire.

References

 
 Rao, Velcheru Narayana, and David Shulman, Sanjay Subrahmanyam. Symbols of substance : court and state in Nayaka period Tamilnadu (Delhi ; Oxford : Oxford University Press, 1998) ; xix, 349 p., [16] p. of plates : ill., maps ; 22 cm. ; Oxford India paperbacks ; Includes bibliographical references and index ; .
 Sathianathaier, R. History of the Nayaks of Madura [microform] by R. Sathyanatha Aiyar ; edited for the University, with introduction and notes by S. Krishnaswami Aiyangar ([Madras] : Oxford University Press, 1924) ; see also ([London] : H. Milford, Oxford university press, 1924) ; xvi, 403 p. ; 21 cm. ; SAMP early 20th-century Indian books project item 10819.
K.A. Nilakanta Sastry, History of South India, From Prehistoric times to fall of Vijayanagar, 1955, OUP, (Reprinted 2002) .

History of Tamil Nadu
History of Andhra Pradesh
History of Karnataka
1616 in India
Battles involving the Vijayanagara Empire
Conflicts in 1616